Help 2.0 was released on March 31, 2015. A follow-up to her 2014 solo debut album, Help, the release marks the second solo studio album apart from her duo of Mary Mary, which was produced by her husband Warryn Campbell and released under the eOne record label.

Track listing
Credits adapted from liner notes.

 Notes
Track 2. All Instruments: Warryn Campbell Guitar: Chris "#9" Payton Talkbox: "mr. Talkbox".
Track 3. All Instruments: Baby Dubb Background Vocals: Edna Perry And Melodye Perry.
Track 4. All Instruments: Baby Dubb  
Track 5. Drums: Baby Dubb All Guitars: John "jubu" Smith.
Track 6. All Instruments: Rodney Jones Jr. Guitar: Dylan Mcgee Jones Background Vocals: The Family And Friends Chorale. 
Track 7. Piano: Gerald Haddon Acoustic Guitars: Chris "#9" Paytonb Ukulele: Tammi Haddon Drums Percussion & Keys: Warryn Campbell. 
Track 8. All Instruments: Warryn Campbell Horns: Dontae Winslow Vocal Production: Lashawn Daniels For The Book Productions And Warryn Campbell.
Track 9. Drums. Bass Guitar & Fender Rhodes: Warryn Campbell Ac. Guitar: Chris "#9" Payton Organ: Aaron Lindsey Harmonica: Pat Berginson Claps: Marvin Winans Jr., Monique Winans, Erica Campbell, Warryn Campbell, Background Vocals: Chris "#9" Payton, Tina Campbell, Warryn Campbell, Erica Campbell Lisa Knowles Vocals Recorded At Lost Studios By Marque "keybeeetsss" Walker.
Track 10. All Instruments: Warryn Campbell Background Vocals: The Family And Friends Chorale.
Track 11. All Instruments: Warryn Campbell Acoustic Guitars: Chris "#9" Payton.
Track 12. All Instruments: Warryn Campbell 
Track 13. Acoustic Guitars & Banjo: Chris "#9" Payton Drums: Teddy Campbell Bass: Rodney Jones Jr. Keys, Electric Guitars & Percussion: Warryn Campbell Background Vocals: Shanta Atkins, Erica Campbell, Warryn Campbell, Marvin Winans Jr., Jason Mcgee & Psalms 
Track 14. String Arrangement: Jamar Jones Background Vocals: Gromyko Collins, Musiq Soulchild, Krista Campbell, Erica Campbell, Jason Mcgee & Psalms

Chart performance

References

2014 debut albums
Erica Campbell albums